Lancashire Probation Trust is a criminal justice agency responsible for punishing and rehabilitating offenders in Lancashire, England.

It is one of 35 probation trusts in England and Wales that make up the National Probation Service. The Ministry of Justice (United Kingdom) has overall responsibility for the National Probation Service and is also responsible for courts, prisons and constitutional affairs.

Aims 
The Trust enforces punishment of offenders, works to rehabilitate offenders, and upholds the interests of the victims of crime. It is responsible for the delivery of reports about offenders to the courts and the supervision of offenders in the community. It also runs programmes and interventions to rehabilitate offenders.

Working with the courts 

Lancashire Probation is responsible for the preparation of pre-sentence reports for the courts. When an offender is found guilty, the sentencer may order from the probation trust a formal report prepared by a probation officer that includes details on why the offence occurred, the circumstances, the offender’s personal background and an assessment of the risk they may still pose to the public. The sentencer can then consider the report when deciding sentencing . Probation staff also prepare bail information reports which assess an offender’s suitability for bail, and arrange placements at probation hostels.

Working in the community 

A lot of  work is centred on adult offenders who are ordered to serve their sentences in the community as part of a community order. There are twelve possible requirements that can be used to make up a community order and judges can sentence an offender to any combination from them. The twelve requirements are:
 
Community Payback (the new name for community service)
 Activity (e.g. Basic skills courses)
 Programme (a course to address offending behaviour)
Prohibited Activity (e.g. being banned from entering licensed premises)
Curfew
Exclusion (being banned from entering a specified place)
Residence (must live at a specified address)
Mental Health treatment
Drug Rehabilitation
Alcohol Treatment
 Supervision (offender attends regular appointments with probation)
 Attendance Centre (under 25s only)

Community Payback 

Community Payback can be a single requirement attached to a community order or can form part of a larger order. The court can order the offender to complete between 40 and 300 hours of unpaid work, depending on the seriousness of the offence. 
The aim of community payback is to reduce re-offending. Trusts work with local communities to find suitable work placements for the offenders to complete.

Programmes 

Nationally accredited programmes aim to reduce reoffending by getting offenders to address offending behaviour and challenging their attitudes and beliefs. They are intense courses that can be long .  The programmes that the probation service delivers in Lancashire are:

 Thinking Skills Programme A thinking skills group work  programme designed to help change thoughts, attitudes and values behind criminal behaviour.
Addressing Substance Related Offending It is a behaviour programme that looks at reducing substance abuse and preventing re-offending. Its focus is on changing attitude and solving problems. 
Drink Impaired Driving For offences of driving with excess alcohol or linked offences. 
Sex Offender Group work Programme (SOGP) For adult male offenders who have committed sexual offences. Specialist assessment is required for this intensive programme. 
Internet Sex Offender Programme - ISOP For male offenders with convictions for internet only sex offences. It is designed to reduce the risk of future internet offending and progression to contact sex offending. 
Controlling Anger and Learning to Manage  -  CALM -  A programme for male offenders to reduce aggressive and offending behaviour through teaching social skills, emotional management and cognitive techniques
Community Domestic violence Programme - CDVP-  A programme for male Offenders to reduce/stop acts of  domestic violence against partners/ex-partners thus reducing the risk of repeat victimisation.

Managing Sexual and Violent Offenders 
 
Lancashire Probation Trust, along with Lancashire Constabulary and Her Majesty's Prison Service work closely together under Multi-Agency Public Protection Arrangements (MAPPA) to manage high risk sexual or violent offenders. The agencies assess the risk, then prepare and implement plans to minimise it. This work is supported by a range of other agencies which have a duty to cooperate, including local authority housing, education and social services, the health service and job centres, and a Youth Offending Team.

Supervising Offenders Released from Prison 

Every offender sentenced to 12 months or more in prison is required to be supervised in the community for a proportion of their sentence. Probation staff work closely with HMPS to help prepare offenders for release. This might involve helping to secure accommodation, reinstating family ties and finding employment. 
 
Probation staff also supervise prisoners who have been released on a life licence (usually after they have served part or all of a life sentence). This means that the offender has to regularly meet with probation staff for the rest of their life.

Working with Victims 

Lancashire Probation Trust employ dedicated victim liaison officers who contact all victims of sexual or violent offences within two months of the offender being sentenced to prison. Through these officers it is intended that victims are updated about the sentence, and what will happen when the offender is released, and are able to voice their concerns and contribute to release proposals.
  
Lancashire now has a dedicated Partnership called Homicide Empathy with Lancashire Partnership (HELP) to work with the families of victims of murder and manslaughter.
The HELP partnership is a collaboration of Criminal Justice and Voluntary Agencies. The partnership was set up by Lancashire Constabulary and Lancashire Probation Trust, and now includes Victim Support, HM Prison Service, Support After Murder And Manslaughter National (SAMM), Lancashire Criminal Justice Board and the Sophie Lancaster Foundation.

Working With Women Offenders 

Lancashire Probation Trust released a strategy for working with women offenders on International Women's Day 2011. The strategy has the following aims:

  To reduce the number of women in custody, including those on remand.
  To increase the number of women successfully completing Orders and Licences and reduce the reconviction rate of female offenders.
  To improve the criminal justice, health and social outcomes for women offenders and their families by ensuring that every woman offender has access to community provision which addresses her needs.

References

External links 
 Lancashire Probation Trust website
 Lancashire Probation Trust microsite
 A report on Offender Management in Lancashire (OMI 2), HM Inspectorate of Probation, 25 October 2011

Probation trusts in England
Organisations based in Lancashire